Petar Gigić (born 7 March 1997) is a Serbian football forward who plays for Javor Ivanjica.

Career
On 22 July 2019, Gigić signed a four-year contract with the Belgrade club.  Partizan compensated Mačva with €150,000.  On 19 September 2019, Gigić made his Partizan debut after he came on as an 87th-minute substitute, in the UEFA Europa League game against AZ Alkmaar.

References

External links
 
 Petar Gigić stats at utakmica.rs

1997 births
Living people
Sportspeople from Pristina
Association football forwards
Serbian footballers
FK Radnički Niš players
FK Mačva Šabac players
OFK Beograd players
FK Partizan players
Újpest FC players
FK Novi Pazar players
Serbian First League players
Serbian SuperLiga players
Nemzeti Bajnokság I players
Serbian expatriate footballers
Expatriate footballers in Hungary
Serbian expatriate sportspeople in Hungary